is a Japanese manga anthology magazine published by Ichijinsha. It began as a quarterly publication in July 2005, but was issued bimonthly on odd months from January 2011 to December 2016, when it became monthly. Kanako Umezawa has served as Comic Yuri Hime's Editor-in-Chief since 2017.

It is the successor to Yuri Shimai and features manga with the same yuri (lesbian) themes. Comic Yuri Hime was financially dependent upon Monthly Comic Zero Sum, but from 2008 on the magazine has become independent. To celebrate this, the eleventh volume, released on January 18, 2008, included an extra called Petit Yuri Hime, a collaboration of artists from Comic Yuri Hime, Comic Yuri Hime S and Yuri Hime: Wildrose. Comic Yuri Hime S was Comic Yuri Hime'''s male-targeted sister magazine.

Current serialized works
During the period when the magazine was released quarterly and bimonthly the majority of the manga in Yuri Hime were one-shots. Many of the bound volumes released under the Yuri Hime label are collections of one-shots that a manga author drew for the magazine. However after becoming monthly there have been more serialized stories. Asumi-chan is Interested in Lesbian Brothels! (Kuro Itsuki)Citrus (Saburouta)Does it Count if You Lose Your Virginity to an Android? (Yakiniku Teishoku)I'm in Love with the Villainess (Inori and Aono Sumio)Onna Tomodachi to Kekkon Shitemita (Shio Usui)Semelparous (Ogino Jun)The Summer You Were There (Yuama)Wataten!: An Angel Flew Down to Me (Nanatsu Mukunoki) Whisper Me a Love Song (Eku Takeshima)Yuri Is My Job! (Miman) YuruYuri (Namori)

Previous serialized works
2000sAmeiro Kochakan Kandan (Miyabi Fujieda)Aoi Shiro (Tomoyuki Fumotogawa and Pochi Edoya)Apple Day Dream (Nene Jounouchi)Clover (Hiyori Otsu)Creo the Crimson Crisis (Takewakamaru)The Conditions of Paradise (Akiko Morishima)Epitaph (Aya Syouoto)First Love Sisters (Mizuo Shinonome)Hanjuku Joshi (Akiko Morishima)Haru Natsu Aki Fuyu (Taishi Zaō and Eiki Eiki)Himitsu Shōjo (Chi-Ran)Kawaii Anata (Hiyori Otsu)Kisses, Sighs, and Cherry Blossom Pink (Milk Morinaga)Kotonoha no Miko to Kotodama no Majo to (Miyabi Fujieda)Mermaid Line (Renjūrō Kindaichi)Nanami and Misuzu (Sunao Minakata)Otome Cake (Mako Takahashi)Shōjo Bigaku (Chi-Ran)Simoun (Hayase Hashiba)Strawberry Shake Sweet (Shizuru Hayashiya) (FLOWERCHILD)Yoruzora no Ōji to Asayake no Hime (Mera Hakamada)Voiceful (Nawoko)ZettaixRoman (Moony Muttri)

2010sDays of Love at Seagull Villa (Kodama Naoko)Donuts Under a Crescent Moon (Shio Usui)Good-bye Dystopia (Hisona)I Married My Best Friend To Shut My Parents Up (Kodama Naoko)If I Could Reach You (tMnR)Inugami-san to Nekoyama-san (Kuzushiro)  (Manio)Lonely Girl ni Sakaraenai (Kashikaze)NTR: Netsuzou Trap (Kodama Naoko)Our Teachers Are Dating! (Oui Pikachi)Our Wonderful Days (Hamuro Kei)Tachibanakan To Lie Angle (Merryhachi)Tokimeki Mononoke Jogakuen (Banana Nangoku) (Kurata Uso)

2020sFutari Escape (Shōichi Taguchi)Namekawa-san won't Take a Licking! (Rie Atou)

Yuri Hime @ PixivYurihime @ Pixiv is official Pixiv account for Yuri Hime. It updated on the 8th and 28th of every month. It is the successor to Nico Nico Yuri Hime.

Serialized worksOhmuroke (Namori) Superwomen in Love! Honey Trap and Rapid Rabbit (sometime)
 Yandere Meruko chan wa Senpai ga Suki'' (Amezawa Koma)

References

External links
 Comic Yuri Hime official website 
 Comic Yuri Hime official Twitter 
 Comic Yuri Hime official Pixiv digital comic page 
 Comic Yuri Hime official NicoNico video page  

2005 establishments in Japan
Bi-monthly manga magazines published in Japan
Ichijinsha magazines
Magazines established in 2005
Monthly manga magazines published in Japan
Men's magazines published in Japan
Magazines published in Tokyo
Quarterly manga magazines published in Japan
Shōjo manga magazines
Josei manga magazines
Yuri (genre) manga magazines